Stade Sous-Ville is a football stadium in Baulmes, Switzerland. It is the home ground of FC Baulmes and has a capacity of 2,500. The stadium has 500 seats and 2,000 standing places.

References
 http://goal.sportal.com.au/venues/switzerland/stade-sous-ville/

Football venues in Switzerland